Rocko's Modern Life is an American animated television series created by Joe Murray for Nickelodeon. The series centers on the surreal life of an anthropomorphic Australian immigrant wallaby named Rocko and his friends: the eccentric steer Heffer Wolfe, the neurotic turtle Filburt, and Rocko's faithful dog Spunky. It is set in the fictional town of O-Town. Throughout its run to present day, this show is controversial for its adult humor, including double entendre, innuendo, and satirical social commentary, similar to The Ren & Stimpy Show. The series has gained a cult following.

Murray created the title character for an unpublished comic book series in the late 1980s, and later reluctantly pitched the series to Nickelodeon, which was looking for edgier cartoonists for its then-new Nicktoons. The network gave the staff a large amount of creative freedom, with the writers targeting both children and adults. The show premiered on September 18, 1993, and ended on November 24, 1996, totaling four seasons and 52 episodes. A special, Rocko's Modern Life: Static Cling, was digitally released on Netflix on August 9, 2019.

The show launched the careers of voice actors Carlos Alazraqui, Mr. Lawrence and Tom Kenny. After the show's cancellation, much of the staff regrouped to work on SpongeBob SquarePants, created by Rockos creative director Stephen Hillenburg.

Premise

Characters

Rocko's Modern Life follows the life of an easily frightened immigrant wallaby named Rocko who encounters various dilemmas and situations regarding otherwise mundane aspects of life. His best friends are Heffer Wolfe, a fat and enthusiastic steer; Filburt, a neurotic turtle who often feels awkward or disturbed and his faithful dog Spunky. Living next door to Rocko is a middle-aged couple, Ed Bighead, a cynical and cantankerous toad who despises Rocko, and his compassionate and more friendly wife Bev.

All of the characters in Rocko's Modern Life are anthropomorphic animals of varying species, the vast majority of whom are mentally unstable. Murray said that he matched personalities of his characters to the various animals in the series to form a social caricature.

Setting
The show is set in a fictional town called O-Town located near the Great Lakes. Places in the town include: Chokey Chicken (later renamed "Chewy Chicken"), a parody of KFC and a favorite place/hang-out for Rocko, Heffer, and Filburt; Conglom-O Corporation, a megacorporation with the slogan "We own you" that owns everything in town; Heck, a place of eternal torment run by Peaches where bad people go when they die; Holl-o-Wood, a town that resembles Hollywood; and Kind of a Lot O' Comics, a comic book store owned by a cruel toad named Mr. Smitty, where Rocko works.

Many of the locations in Rocko's Modern Life have the letter "O" in them; for example, O-Town and Conglom-O Corporation. When asked about the use of "O" in his show, Murray said:

Episodes

Production

Development

Originally, the character appeared in an unpublished comic book titled Travis. Murray tried selling the comic book in the late 1980s, between illustrating jobs and did not find success in getting it into production. Many other characters appeared in various sketchbooks. He described the early 1990s animation atmosphere as "ripe for this kind of project. We took some chances that would be hard to do in these current times (the 1990s)". Murray wanted funding for his independent film My Dog Zero, so he wanted Nickelodeon to pre-buy television rights for the series. He presented a pencil test to Nickelodeon, which afterward became interested in buying and financing the show. Murray had never worked in television before. The industry was coming out of a "rough period" and Murray wanted to "shake things up a bit".

Linda Simensky, then in charge of animation development in Nickelodeon, described the Nicktoons lineup and concept to Murray. He originally felt skepticism towards the concept of creating a Nicktoon as he disliked television cartoons. Simensky told him that Nicktoons differed from other cartoons. He then told her that he believed that My Dog Zero would not work as a cartoon. He then researched Nickelodeon at the library and found that Nickelodeon's "attitude was different than regular TV". The cable network providers were "making their own rules": for example, Murray stated that he "didn't write for children", which the executives were fine with. Murray was unsure at first, but was inspired by independent animation around him, such as Animation Celebration and MTV's Liquid Television, and gave the network a shot. At the time, Nickelodeon was selling itself as a network-based as much around the edge as around kids' entertainment. It aimed to appeal to college students and parents as much as children.

Murray developed the Rocko character after visiting a zoo in the Bay Area and coming across a wallaby that seemed to be oblivious to the chaos around him. Murray combed through his sketchbooks, developed the Rocko's Modern Life concept, and submitted it to Nickelodeon believing that the concept would likely be rejected. Murray felt they would not like the pilot, and he would just collect his sum and begin funding his next independent film. According to Murray, around three or four months later he had "forgotten about" the concept and was working on My Dog Zero when Simensky informed him that Nickelodeon wanted a pilot episode. Murray said that he was glad that he would get funding for My Dog Zero. On his website he describes My Dog Zero as "that film that Linda Simensky saw which led me to Rocko." "Sucker for the Suck-O-Matic" was originally written as the pilot; the executives decided that Heffer Wolfe, one of the characters, would be "a little too weird for test audiences". Murray, instead of removing Heffer from "Sucker for the Suck-O-Matic", decided to write "Trash-O-Madness" as the pilot episode.

In the original series pilot, Rocko was colored yellow. His color was changed when a toy merchandising company informed Nick they were interested in marketing toys but did not want to market Rocko because "they already had a yellow character". Murray changed Rocko's color to beige, but after the pilot aired, the company opted out of producing toys for the series, so the color change was pointless. When the series was in development prior to the release of the first episode, the series had the title The Rocko Show.

In November 1992, two months prior to the production of season 1 of Rocko's Modern Life, Murray's first wife committed suicide. Murray had often blamed his wife's suicide on the show being picked up. He said, "It was always an awful connection because I look at Rocko as such a positive in my life." Murray felt that he had emotional and physical "unresolved issues" when he moved to Los Angeles. He describes the experience as like participating in a "marathon with my pants around my ankles". Murray initially believed that he would create one season, move back to the San Francisco Bay Area, and "clean up the loose ends I had left hanging". Murray said that he felt surprised when Nickelodeon approved new seasons; Nickelodeon renewed the series for its second season in December 1993.

After season 3, he decided to hand the project to Stephen Hillenburg, who performed most of the work for season 4; Murray continued to manage the cartoon. He said that he would completely leave the production after season 4. He said also that he encouraged the network to continue production, but Nickelodeon eventually decided to cancel the series. He described all 52 episodes as "top notch", and in his view the quality of a television show may decline as production continues "when you are dealing with volume". On his website he said that "In some ways it succeeded and in some ways failed. All I know it developed its own flavor and an equally original legion of fans." In a 1997 interview Murray said that he at times wondered if he could restart the series; he feels the task would be difficult.

The show was jointly produced between Games Animation and Joe Murray Productions. Since Nickelodeon did not have an animation studio, it had to contract out to other studios. After incidents with The Ren & Stimpy Show creator John Kricfalusi, Nickelodeon began not to trust its creators as much and began to form its own studio, Games Animation. However, Murray recalls that they were still able to get a lot done independently. Murray has likened the independence to that of "Termite Terrace" (Warner Bros. Cartoons) from the 1930s. As Nickelodeon began to have more and more success with its animation cartoons,  Murray said the "Termite Terrace" mentality was not working as much. Producer Mary Harrington made the move from New York City to Los Angeles to set up Games Animation, in order to produce Rocko's Modern Life. The crew first began production on the show in January 1993. Rocko's Modern Life was Nickelodeon's first in-house animated production.

Murray's Joe Murray Productions and Games Animation rented office space on Ventura Boulevard in the Studio City neighborhood of the San Fernando Valley region of Los Angeles, California. The production moved to a different office building on Vineland Avenue in Studio City. Executives did not share space with the creative team. Murray rented a floor in the Writers Guild of America, West building, although the team of Rocko was not a part of the union, which the staff found ironic. Sunwoo Entertainment, and later Rough Draft Studios, assembled the animation. According to Murray, as Rocko's Modern Life was his first television series, he did not know about the atmosphere of typical animation studios. Murray said that he opted to operate his studio in a similar manner to the operation of his Saratoga, California studio, which he describes as "very relaxed". His cadre included many veterans who, according to him, described the experience as "the most fun they had ever had!" He, saying that the atmosphere was "not my doing", credited his team members for collectively contributing. Murray described the daily atmosphere at the studio as "very loose", adding that the rules permitted all staff members to use the paging system to make announcements. He stated that one visitor compared the environment of the production studio to "preschool without supervision". Murray stated that 70 people in the United States and over 200 people in South Korea and Japan animated the series.

Rick Bentley of the Ventura County Star said that it was unusual for a cartoon creator to select a wallaby as a main character. Bentley also stated that the Rocko universe was influenced by "everything from Looney Tunes to underground comics". The staff of the show consists of fans of outrageous comedy, both animated and not animated. Tom Kenny cited Looney Tunes and SCTV as influences for the show, and also stated "I'm sure if you asked Joe Murray or Mr. Lawrence or any of those guys, especially in terms of animation, the weirdest cartoons would, of course, be our favorites—those weird '30s Fleischer brothers Betty Boop cartoons and stuff like that."

Murray produced the pilot episode, "Trash-O-Madness", at his studio in Saratoga; he animated half of the episode, and the production occurred entirely in the United States, with animation in Saratoga and processing in San Francisco. While directing during recording sessions, Murray preferred to be on the stage with the actors instead of "behind glass" in a control room, which he describes as "the norm" while making animated series. He believes that, due to his lack of experience with children, Rocko's Modern Life "skewed kind of older". Murray noted, "There's a lot of big kids out there. People went to see Roger Rabbit and saw all these characters they'd grown up with and said, 'Yeah, why don't they have something like that anymore?'" When he began producing Rocko, he says that his experience in independent films initially led him to attempt to micromanage many details in the production. He said that the approach, when used for production of television shows, was "driving me crazy". This led him to allow other team members to manage aspects of the Rocko's Modern Life production. Director and later creative director Stephen Hillenburg met Murray at an animation film festival where he was showing his three short films. Murray hired Hillenburg as a director on the series, making Hillenburg's first job in the animation business as a director.

Murray designed the logo of the series. He said that, after his design drifted from the original design, Nickelodeon informed Murray of how it intended the logo to look like. Murray also designed the covers of the comic book, the VHS releases, and the DVD releases.

Writing
The writers aimed to create stories that they describe as "strong" and "funny". The writers, including George Maestri and Martin Olson, often presented ideas to Murray while eating hamburgers at Rocky's, a restaurant formerly located on Lankershim in the North Hollywood section of the San Fernando Valley. He took his team members on "writing trips" to places such as Rocky's, the La Brea Tar Pits, and the wilderness. If he liked the story premises, the writers produced full outlines from the premises. Outlines approved by both him and Nickelodeon became Rocko's Modern Life episodes. Maestri describes some stories as originating from "real life" and some originating from "thin air". Murray stated that each episode of Rocko's Modern Life stemmed from the personal experiences of himself and/or one or more of the directors or writers. He said that he did not intend to use formulaic writing seen in other cartoons; he desired content that "broke new ground" and "did things that rode the edge", and that could be described as "unexpected". He did not hire writers who had previous experience with writing cartoons, instead, hiring writers who worked outside of animation, including improv actors and comic artists. He said that story concept that "ever smacked close to some formula idea that we had all seen before" received the immediate rejection.

Jeff "Swampy" Marsh, a storyboard writer who went on to create Phineas and Ferb, says that writers of Rocko's Modern Life targeted children and adults. He cites Rocky and Bullwinkle as an example of another series that contains references indecipherable by children and understood by adults. Aiming for a similar goal, Marsh described the process as "a hard job". According to him, when censors questioned proposed material, sometimes the team disagreed with the opinions of the censors and sometimes the team agreed with the rationale of the censors. He says that "many people" told him that the team "succeeded in this endeavor" and that "many parents I know really enjoyed watching the show with their kids for just this reason". John Pacenti said the series "seems very much aimed at adults" "for a children's cartoon". Marsh believes that the material written by Doug Lawrence stands as an example of a "unique sense of humor". For instance, Marsh credits Lawrence with the "pineapple references" adding that Lawrence believed that pineapples seemed humorous. The staff drew upon Looney Tunes and the Fleischer cartoons to appeal to a wide demographic: having a certain adult sensibility but also enjoyed by kids.

Animation
Rocko's Modern Life has been described as similar to that of the output of Warner Bros. cartoons in the Golden Age: a visually driven show heavy on humor, sight gags, and good animation. Instead of a finished script, the animators usually received a three-page outline, requiring them to come up with a majority of the gags and dialogue. The animation team appreciated this approach, with storyboard artist Jeff Myers, formerly of The Simpsons, quoted as saying "The script [at The Simpsons] was carved in stone. Here it's ... more of a challenge and a lot more fun when we're given a rough outline." Murray's animation lacked parallel lines and featured crooked architecture similar to various Chuck Jones cartoons. In an interview, he stated that his design style contributed to the show's "wonky bent feel". Jean Prescott of the Sun Herald described the series as "squash-and-stretch". A 1993 Houston Chronicle article described the series' setting as having a "reality that is 'squashed and stretched' into a twisted version of real life". The background staff hand-painted backgrounds with Dr. Martin Dyes, while each episode title card consisted of an original painting. Linda Simensky said that she asked the creators of Rocko's Modern Life about why the women in the series were drawn to be "top-heavy", the creators told her that they believed that drawing women "the traditional way" was easier. Simensky described the creators as "talented guys" who formed "a boy's club" and added that "we pushed them to be funny, but a lot of their women are stereotypical".

Music
There are three versions of the Rocko's Modern Life theme song. The first and original version can be heard playing throughout every episode in Season 1 except for episode 8. The second version of the theme song was a slightly remixed version of the first and was used for episode 8. Version 2 had high-pitched, distorted voices in the chorus. The third version of the theme song was performed by Kate Pierson and Fred Schneider from The B-52's. They performed the Rocko's Modern Life theme song for the rest of the series.

At first, Murray wanted Paul Sumares to perform the theme song since Sumares created most of the music found in My Dog Zero. Murray wanted the same style in My Dog Zero exhibited in Rocko's Modern Life. Nickelodeon wanted a person with more experience. According to Sumares, believing for the request to be a long shot, Murray asked for Danny Elfman and felt stunned when Nickelodeon decided to honor his request by asking Elfman to perform. According to Murray, Elfman, his first choice, was booked. Therefore, he chose the B-52's, his second choice. According to Sumares Murray decided to use the B-52's instead of Elfman. Murray states that the difference between the stories "could just be a recollection conflict because Paul is a brilliant amazing guy." Murray also sought Alan Silvestri. According to Sumares, Viacom did not want to use Silvestri as the organization wanted a band "slightly older kids could identify with."

Pat Irwin, a veteran of many bands, including the New York-based instrumental group the Raybeats, and a side gig, the B-52s, spent five years as a music director on the series. Leading a six-piece combo, Irwin brought together musicians such as trombonist Art Baron and drummer Kevin Norton.

Like SpongeBob SquarePants and Ren & Stimpy, Irwin also uses selections from the APM Music into his score.

Censorship
Rocko's Modern Life has been noted for its racy humor. Adults made up more than one-fifth of the audience for the show during its run. The series contained numerous adult innuendos, such as Rocko's brief stint as a telephone operator at what is implied to be a sex hotline in the season one episode "Canned": the instructions on the wall behind him helpfully remind all employees to "Be Hot, Be Naughty, and Be Courteous" while he flatly repeats "Oh baby" into the receiver, who turned out to be Mrs. Bighead. Joe Murray noted that the season one episode "Leap Frogs" received "some complaints from some parents" due to its sexual humor, leading to Nickelodeon removing the episode from air for the remainder of the show's run, although it later aired on the cable channel Nicktoons, and was made available on DVD and video streaming sites such as Netflix (formerly) and Paramount+. In a deleted scene from the season one episode "The Good, the Bad and the Wallaby", Heffer encounters a milking machine and finds pleasure, although only his reactions are shown onscreen. According to writer/director Jeff "Swampy" Marsh, the scene was originally supposed to have hearts appearing in Heffer's eyes at the climactic moment. Although it clearly wasn't going to be included, they described the scene to the Nickelodeon censors anyway: "We described the scene, and then waited for the axe to fall, but all they said was 'can you change the hearts to stars?', we said sure, and it went in." The scene, as well as another scene with Heffer saying, "Goodbye" to the milking machine, were later removed. They are intact in the Canadian broadcasts of the episode, however. In addition, the uncut version can still be found on the VHS tape "Rocko's Modern Life: With Friends Like These".

There were at least two occurrences of immediate censorship of the series. The original broadcast of the season two episode "Road Rash" featured a scene in which Rocko and Heffer stop at what is suggested to be a love hotel (the "No-Tell Motel") advertising "hourly rates" and ask the horse desk clerk for a room, who infers the two will be engaging in intercourse: "All night? [whistles] Wheeeooo! Okay." The scene was never shown again after its first airing, but a low quality clip was made available online as early as late December 1997, and two higher quality clips have been available as late as 2021. The first airing of the season two episode "Hut Sut Raw" included a scene in which Rocko is picking berries; upon picking one lower on the bush, a bear rushes out whimpering and grasping his crotch. This scene is left intact in the Canadian broadcasts of the episode. Both scenes were edited by Nickelodeon after their first broadcasts and are the only instances of censorship on the season two DVD, released in 2012. On the season three DVD, the "Wacky Delly" segment was shortened by approximately ten seconds to remove footage of Sal Ami repeatedly whacking Betty Bologna over the head with a telephone receiver. In addition, the restaurant named "Chokey Chicken" (a term for masturbation) was renamed "Chewy Chicken" for the series' fourth season. However, in the 2019 special Rocko's Modern Life: Static Cling, they go back to using the original "Chokey Chicken" name. As the series entered reruns after cancellation, more scenes were cut. The entire episode "Leap Frogs", in which Bev Bighead attempts to seduce Rocko, was skipped. The entire episode "Heff in a Handbasket", in which Heffer Wolfe attempts to sell his soul, was also skipped.

When Shout! Factory and Paramount announced a DVD retail release for the series, there were concerns on whether Nickelodeon would allow them to release the series complete with some of the racier humor that the network eventually cut out for reruns. In the end, Shout! Factory and Paramount only received materials from sources that were edited for broadcast, so the episodes still remained censored on the DVDs.
The only uncut release of the show on DVD so far was published in Germany in October 2013, although this release is still missing the uncut version of "Road Rash".

Back when the show was rerun on Nicktoons, "Leap Frogs" and "Heff in a Handbasket" (the two episodes banned for content) were restored. While the former got removed from the rotation again, the latter was still in circulation until the show itself got removed from the network.

Broadcast
Rocko's Modern Life first ran on Nickelodeon from 1993 to 1996, and was briefly syndicated to local stations by Nick during 1995 and 1996.

In 2004, the show briefly returned to Nickelodeon as part of U-Pick Live Old School Pick, with select episodes airing on June 1 and June 11. In the summer of 2006, the series once again returned to Nick as part of the Nick Rewind block, and on November 22, 2007, it was shown on Super Stuffed Nicksgiving Weekend. Reruns of Rocko's Modern Life aired on Nicktoons in the United States from May 1, 2002, to September 5, 2011.

In the UK, the series premiered on Nickelodeon UK on November 6, 1993. The series was also screened on Channel 4 from August 9, 1994, until 2000. From 2002 to 2017, it also aired on Nicktoons in the United Kingdom.

MTV picked up Rocko's Modern Life from Nickelodeon in early 1994. In Malaysia, Rocko's Modern Life was aired on MetroVision. The series was also shown in Ukraine on ICTV. In Italy, Rocko's Modern Life was aired on Rai 2.

Rocko's Modern Life aired again on NickRewind (formerly known as "The 90's Are All That") in the US from September 5 to September 23, 2011, and from February 11 to March 1, 2013. On the night leading into April Fools' Day 2013, The 90's Are All That, aired a prank "lost episode" of the series consisting solely of a still picture of a mayonnaise jar. This is a reference to the two-part episode "Wacky Delly", in which the characters attempt to sabotage the show-within-a-show, Wacky Delly. The series then returned to the block, renamed The Splat, from 2015 to 2021.

In Australia, it was aired on Network Ten from 1993 to 1994 and later they aired on Nickelodeon from 1995 to 2003.

In Canada, it was aired on YTV from 1994 to 2000. The series aired in reruns on Canadian Nickelodeon from November 2, 2009, to August 29, 2022.

In the Arab League, it was aired on Spacetoon English from 2005 to 2011.

In the early 2000s, Nickelodeon Japan marketed the show along with The Ren & Stimpy Show.

In Greater China, it was aired on STAR Chinese Channel during the 1990s.

Home media
Fans have requested that Nickelodeon produce a DVD collection of the series for years. Murray has often got e-mails from fans, and his top question was "When will Rocko be on DVD?" Prior to the official DVD releases, Murray stated that he had not heard of any plans for a DVD release and that there are several bootleg DVD releases of the series sold on eBay. He commented, "But at least someone is trying to give Rocko fans what they want. Because Nickelodeon sure isn't doing it." Murray worked with his legal team to regain the rights, and an official DVD was released.

The first home video release of the series in the United States was in 1995, when selected episodes were released on VHS by Sony Wonder. Sony Wonder used Rocko's Modern Life, alongside other television programs as "leading brands" in order for the company to break into the market. In addition, the "How to Tell if Your Dog is Brainless" short can only be found on the Sony Wonder version of the VHS "Rocko's Modern Life: Machine Madness". Paramount Home Media Distribution re-released the tapes in 1997 and one tape in 1998.

In July 2008, Rocko's Modern Life was added to the iTunes Store as a part of the "Nick Rewind" collection, in four best-of volumes. Eventually, in August 2008, Nickelodeon joined forces with CreateSpace, part of the Amazon.com Inc. group of companies, to make a number of animated and live-action shows available on DVD, many for the first time. The DVDs were published via CreateSpace DVD on Demand, a service that manufactures discs as soon as customers order them on Amazon.com. Rocko's Modern Life was available in two best-of collections, released in 2008 and a third best-of collection in 2009.

All four seasons were available in streaming format on Netflix until May 31, 2013. As of 2021, Rocko's Modern Life is now available for streaming on Paramount+. The rarely-seen episode "Closet Clown/Seat to Stardom", and the holiday episodes "Rocko's Modern Christmas!: Can't Squeeze Cheer from a Cheese Log!", "Sugar-Frosted Frights/Ed is Dead: A Thriller", and "Turkey Time/Floundering Fathers", but still has edited versions of "The Good, the Bad and the Wallaby", "Road Rash", and "Hut Sut Raw".

In March 2011, Shout! Factory announced that they would release Season 1 in an official box set on June 21, 2011. The two-disc set received relatively positive reviews, only receiving criticism for video quality and the lack of bonus features. According to Joe Murray's website, he struck a deal with Shout! Factory to create the artwork for the Season 2 set; the special features were yet to be announced when he wrote the entry. Season 2 was released on February 7, 2012, with Season 3 following on July 3, 2012. On December 3, 2012, creator Joe Murray announced due to strong DVD sales of the first three seasons, Shout! Factory would release Rocko's Modern Life: The Complete Series on DVD on February 26, 2013, along with bonus material from the Rocko's Live event from October 2012; Murray also mentioned that Season 4 would be released individually on DVD soon after the complete series set was released. On February 26, 2013, Rocko's Modern Life: The Complete Series was released by Shout! Factory. The fourth and final season was released on October 15, 2013. On November 20, 2018, Rocko's Modern Life: The Complete Series was re-released by Paramount Home Media Distribution.

The complete series was released in Germany on October 4, 2013. The limited edition eight-disc set includes a 3D card, sticker set, postcards, episode guide, and poster, as well as bonus features included on the discs. Since the show was aired uncensored on Nickelodeon Germany in the mid-'90s, the German publishers were able to reconstruct a nearly uncensored release of the show, although this release is still missing the uncut version of "Road Rash". So far, it is the only official DVD box set available that is almost completely uncut.

The Best of Rocko's Modern Life was released in the United Kingdom in 2012 as four one-disc volumes. These were released exclusively for Poundland stores. Rocko's Modern Life: The Complete Series was released in the UK on November 12, 2018.

In Australia, the first three seasons are available on DVD. Season 1 and Season 2 were released on April 3, 2013. Season 3 was released on June 5, 2013.

On August 1, 2016, a Collector's Edition box set which contains all four seasons was released. It is not known if season four has been released individually. Also released was a Limited Edition 3D artwork for Seasons One and Two. Exclusive DVDs can still be bought at JB Hi-Fi or rented at Video Ezy.

Reception

Ratings
Murray said that the cartoon "resonated" with people because the scenarios depicted in the cartoon involving "the neurosis, the daily chores of everyday life" were based on Murray's own experiences "breaking out into the world" after leaving school. The show had debuted in a preview on September 18, 1993, and officially premiered the following morning, to join Nickelodeon's Sunday morning animation block. On September 18, the series' first night of airing, Rocko's Modern Life received a 3.0 in ratings. By January 31, 1994, the series' audience grew by 65%. Rocko's Modern Life was at the time the network's highest-rated cartoon launch ever. There was a brief period in 1993 when the network received numerous complaints from members of a religious group that Ren & Stimpy and Rocko's Modern Life were too adult-oriented to be shown to kids on Sunday mornings. They wanted the shows moved to a different time slot. The network was polite but did not make the programming change.

Critical reception
Initial reviews of Rocko's Modern Life were positive. The Miami Herald ran an article about series that were "rais[ing] the standards for children's programming", singling out Rocko's Modern Life as "definitely worth a look". Jennifer Mangan of the Chicago Tribune likened the series to The Simpsons, noting the show as another example of adult animation that is "not for kids". Newsday highlighted the show's twisted sight gags. Ted Drozdowski of The Boston Phoenix stated in the "Eye pleasers" article that he enjoyed Rocko's Modern Life because of "jovial excitement", "good-hearted outrage", "humanity", and "pushy animated characterizations". However, not all reviews were positive. Ken Tucker of Entertainment Weekly described the series as "a witless rip-off of Ren & Stimpy: mucus jokes without the redeeming surrealism or contempt for authority." Charles Solomon of the Los Angeles Times called the series "rock bottom" and a "tasteless attempt to capture the Ren & Stimpy audience", mostly expressing displeasure at the crass humor.

Common Sense Media reviewer Emily Ashby gave Rocko's Modern Life four stars, stating that Rocko's Modern Life is "modern and funny, but edgy content isn't suitable for young kids.

The show has seen renewed acclaim. Brahna Siegelberg of Slate said that the aspect that was most compelling was that the show had "a really poignant critique of the materialist demands of American life". She added that she "realized that Rocko was really a show about how to navigate the adult world; one that could be appreciated by kids for its slapstick humor and absurdity, but had even more to say to young adults—like me". IGN called the show a prime example of the "sophisticated, intelligent brand of children's programming" during Nickelodeon's golden age. The A.V. Club also called the show "one of the best series" from that era, praising the show's "impressive commitment to expressive character acting, well-drawn sight gags, and cartoony jokes that play with the form's slapstick strengths." New York compared the series' humor, in retrospect, to that of Office Space (1999) and praised the subversive, anti-corporate stories.

Awards and nominations
Timothy J. Borquez, Patrick Foley, Michael Giesler, Michael A. Gollorn, William B. Griggs, Tom Jeager, Gregory LaPlante, Timothy Mertens, and Kenneth Young of Rocko's Modern Life received a 1994 Daytime Emmy Award for Outstanding Film Sound Editing.

George Maestri was nominated for a CableACE Award for his Rocko's Modern Life writing.

The series won an Environmental Media Award in 1996 for the episode "Zanzibar!", a musical episode focusing on environmentalism, pollution, and deforestation. The award was accepted by the episode's writers, Dan Povenmire and Jeff "Swampy" Marsh, future creators of the hit Disney animated series Phineas and Ferb.

Legacy and impact
The fourth Nicktoon to debut, Rocko's boasts a sizable cult fanbase to this day. Tom Kenny cited Rocko's Modern Life as vital in him learning how to do voiceovers for animation. He recalled that seeing Charlie Adler have a two-way conversation with himself as the Bigheads without any edits was "dazzling". Kenny described the show's impact in an interview, saying, "Rocko's Modern Life was just one of those shows that were the first break for a lot of people who went on to do other stuff in the business."

Some members of the Rocko's Modern Life staff created other successful ventures. Mitch Schauer, the show's assistant storyboard artist, would later create The Angry Beavers, which premiered on Nickelodeon in 1997 and ended in 2001. Stephen Hillenburg pitched SpongeBob SquarePants to Nickelodeon in 1997. Murray said of the pitch, "If it goes well, it'll be a blessing to us all." The network bought the show, which premiered in 1999, and it became a popular, critical and financial success, and one of the biggest shows on Nick. Hillenburg stated that he "learned a great deal about writing and producing animation for TV" from his time on Rocko's Modern Life. Two writers for the series, Dan Povenmire and Jeff "Swampy" Marsh, went on to create Phineas and Ferb for the Disney Channel; the show became a ratings success and received numerous award nominations. When Murray returned with a new animated series, Camp Lazlo on Cartoon Network, in 2005, much of the former staff of Rocko's Modern Life joined him. Murray stated that "We always kept in touch and they told me to look them up if I ever did another project", adding that the crew already knew his sensibilities and an extra decade worth of experience. Carlos Alazraqui, who played Rocko, also ended up playing the main character of Lazlo. Derek Drymon and Nick Jennings, both part of the staff, went on to be responsible for the tone and visual looks of a lot of very successful animated series that came later.

TV special

In September 2015, Nickelodeon stated that some of its old properties were being considered for revivals, and that Rocko's Modern Life was one of them.

On August 11, 2016, Nickelodeon announced that they had greenlit a one-hour TV special, with Joe Murray as executive producer. Murray revealed to Motherboard that in the special, Rocko would come back to O-Town after being in space for 20 years, and that it would focus on people's reliance on modern technology. On June 22, 2017, it was announced that the title of the special would be Rocko's Modern Life: Static Cling and that it would air in 2018. They also reconfirmed that the entire main cast and recurring cast would be reprising their roles, alongside new voice actors Steve Little and co-director Cosmo Segurson. A special sneak peek was released to coincide with the Rocko panel at San Diego Comic-Con 2017.

On May 10, 2019, it was announced that Netflix has acquired the distribution rights to both Rocko's Modern Life: Static Cling and Invader Zim: Enter the Florpus and the streaming service confirmed a day later they would premiere sometime in the summer of 2019.

On July 16, 2019, it was confirmed alongside an exclusive clip by the Rocko's Modern Life official Instagram page and various news sources that the show would premiere on Netflix on August 9, 2019.

In other media
A person wearing a Rocko’s Modern Life hoodie can be seen in the music video for the Blink-182 song "Happy Days".

Rocko appears in a Robot Chicken skit in the episode "Fila Ogden in: Maggie's Got a Full Load" where he attempts to leave Australia for America, but ends up getting run over by cars in the street.

Rocko is featured in the trailer for the Smite and Nickelodeon crossover, along with Zim from Invader Zim, and Danny Phantom from the animated series of the same name, released on July 5, 2022. The Nickelodeon exclusive edition was released a week later.

Merchandise
By January 31, 1994, Nickelodeon received ten "licensing partners" for merchandise for the series. Hardee's distributed Rocko toys. Viacom New Media released one game based on the show, Rocko's Modern Life: Spunky's Dangerous Day, in the United States on April 1, 1994, for the Super Nintendo Entertainment System. In addition, Microsoft's Nickelodeon 3-D Movie Maker features various characters from the show. Rocko also appeared as a playable character in the game Nicktoons: Attack of the Toybots. Rocko and Heffer also make cameo appearances in Nicktoons MLB, and are both playable in Nickelodeon Kart Racers 2: Grand Prix, which features with two racetracks based on the show. Rocko also appears as a playable character in Nickelodeon All-Star Brawl via downloadable content. Nick.com created two free online games featuring Rocko, using Shockwave (which requires the Shockwave Player plugin, website also requires Flash Player plugin). Hot Topic sells Rocko's Modern Life merchandise such as T-shirts, wristbands, keychains and other items as part of their Nick Classic line. In 1997, plushes of Rocko, Spunky, and Heffer were released exclusively at the Viacom Entertainment Store. They are difficult to find in the present day and age, and in 2016, a different Rocko plush was released.

Comics
During Tom DeFalco's Editor-in-Chief career, Marvel Comics produced a seven-issue Rocko's Modern Life comic book series. Marvel published the series from June 1994 to December 1994 with monthly releases.

Nickelodeon approached Marvel, asking the company to produce comic book series for Rocko's Modern Life and Ren and Stimpy. Marvel purchased the license for Rocko from Nickelodeon. The staff created the comics, and Susan Luposniak, a Nickelodeon employee, examined the comics before they were released. Joe Murray said in a December 2, 2008 blog entry that he drew some of the pages in the comic book series.

The comics contain stories not seen in the television show. In addition, the comic book series omits some television show characters and places, while some original places and characters appear in the comics. John "Lewie" Lewandowski wrote all of the stories except for one; Joey Cavalieri wrote "Beaten by a Club", the second story of Issue #4.

Troy Little, a resident of Monroe, Oregon, wrote to Marvel requesting that the title for the comic's letters column should be "That's Life". In Issue 3, published in August 1994, the editors decided to use the title for the comic's "Letters to the Editor" section. In Issue 5, published in October 1994, the editors stated that they were still receiving suggestions for the title of the comic even though they had decided on using "That's Life" by Issue 3.

On December 6, 2017, Boom! Studios began publishing a new Rocko's Modern Life comic book series.

See also
 Camp Lazlo 
 Let's Go Luna!
 SpongeBob SquarePants

References

Citations

Works cited

External links

 Joe Murray Studio. Archived from the original on February 9, 2017.
 
 
 Rocko's Modern Life at Don Markstein's Toonopedia. Archived from the original on February 9, 2017. 
  Trainor, Pat, ed., The Rocko's Modern Life FAQ. Includes interviews with series creator Joe Murray and production staff. Archived from the original on March 15, 2016.

 
1990s American animated television series
1990s American children's comedy television series
1990s Nickelodeon original programming
1993 American television series debuts
1996 American television series endings
American children's animated comedy television series
Censored television series
English-language television shows
Nicktoons
Television series about kangaroos and wallabies
Television series by Rough Draft Studios
Television series created by Joe Murray
Television shows adapted into comics
Television shows adapted into video games
Television shows set in the United States